The John and Susanna Ahlf House is a historic residence in Grants Pass, Oregon, United States. Built in 1902, it is the finest remaining example of the Queen Anne style in Grants Pass, and was the most prominent home in the city prior to World War I. It was built for John Ahlf (1856–1932), a German immigrant and meat packer who became one of the leading businessmen of the Rogue Valley.

The house was added to the National Register of Historic Places in 1983.

See also
National Register of Historic Places listings in Josephine County, Oregon

References

External links

German-American culture in Oregon
Houses completed in 1902
1902 establishments in Oregon
Buildings and structures in Grants Pass, Oregon
National Register of Historic Places in Josephine County, Oregon
Houses on the National Register of Historic Places in Oregon
Queen Anne architecture in Oregon
Houses in Josephine County, Oregon